The Unknown Soldier is a Finnish war film directed by Edvin Laine that premiered in December 1955. It is based on The Unknown Soldier, a novel by Väinö Linna. The story is about the Continuation War between Finland and the Soviet Union as told from the viewpoint of ordinary Finnish soldiers.

The film was and remains the most successful movie ever in Finland; about 2.8 million people, or more than half the Finnish population, saw it in theaters. Its portrayal of Linna's characters is widely accepted as canonical. The film was voted the best Finnish movie by 1213 respondents in an Internet poll by Helsingin Sanomat in 2007.

The novel would be filmed again in 1985 by Rauni Mollberg and again in 2017 by Aku Louhimies.

Synopsis

Set against the events of the Finnish Continuation War, the film follows a machine gun troop's journey into the Soviet Union. The troop includes the simple-minded Hietanen, the jokey Vanhala, the cynical Lahtinen, the cowardly Riitaoja and grumpy Lehto. The film also follows the commanding officers, such as the happy and slightly senile Captain Kaarna, the young and idealistic 2nd Lieutenant Kariluoto, the calm and modest 2nd Lieutenant Koskela and the strict and unsympathetic Lieutenant Lammio.

They face many struggles, such as seeing the supportive Kaarna die in their first battle, three of the soldiers refusing to leave their punishment post during an air-raid as well as defending the trenches after the Finns have taken back parts of Karelia. Part of the way, the troop is joined by Rokka, a Karelian veteran of the Winter War, who also clashes with Lammio due to having little respect for military discipline despite being an excellent and capable soldier.

Throughout the film several of the main characters die. Lehto is injured during night-patrol, left behind and shoots himself. Riitaoja dies the same night when he runs off frightened and gets lost in the woods. Lahtinen dies during the winter, defending his position as his fellow soldiers flee. Hietanen becomes blinded when he saves a young serviceman from being shot. His military ambulance crashes and the blinded Hietanen is gunned down by passing Russian planes while trying to save the other injured soldiers. Kariluoto dies while leading a counter-attack, and shortly afterwards Koskela gets shot while destroying a tank using a satchel charge.

Cast

 Kosti Klemelä as Lt. Koskela
 Heikki Savolainen as Sgt. Hietanen
 Reino Tolvanen as Cpl. Rokka
 Veikko Sinisalo as Cpl. Lahtinen
 Åke Lindman as Cpl. Lehto
 Pentti Siimes as PFC. Määttä
 Leo Riuttu as Pvt. Vanhala
 Kaarlo Halttunen as Pvt. Rahikainen
 Matti Ranin as Cpt. Kariluoto
 Jussi Jurkka as Lt. Lammio
 Tauno Palo as Maj. Sarastie
 Pentti Irjala as Cpt. Kaarna
 Vilho Siivola as Supply Cpl. Mäkilä
 Olavi Ahonen as Pvt. Riitaoja
 Tarmo Manni as Pvt. Honkajoki
 Veli-Matti Kaitala as Pvt. Hauhia
 Tapio Hämäläinen as Pvt. Salo
 Martti Romppanen as Pvt. Sihvonen
 Vili Auvinen as Pvt. Asumaniemi

Production
The film began production and was released only a year after the release of the novel. There was an immediate competition for filming rights, which was won by SF Film, led by T. J. Särkkä, after Linna sold the film rights to the book for one million Finnish marks. Filming began in April 1955 in Nurmijärvi, although the final script was not completed until the end of May.

The film is relatively loyal to the original novel though rarely shows the Soviets in most scenes. Kariluoto's death is different though his last words are the same as in the novel. Lammio's come-uppance from a disrespectful soldier during the Finns' retreat is absent from the film. The character Karjula has been omitted entirely. The role of Rahikainen has also been downplayed considerably, as in the novel he is Hietanen's closest friend but merely a support character in the film.

Due to disagreements with SF Film, the Finnish Defense Forces refused to assist with the filming. Thus all soldiers are actors and there is a heavy use of stock footage during several scenes showing Finnish artillery.

As the soldiers are played by SF Film regulars, most are physically much older than their characters in the novel. Several actors were considered for the role of Rokka but were ultimately rejected because they couldn't deliver his Karelian Finnish dialect. Reino Tolvanen was an actual veteran of the Continuation War, having served in the airforce, and was cast due to speaking the dialect naturally.

Edvin Laine and Väinö Linna became good friends during the production. Laine would go on to make several more films based on Linna's novels after the mid-1960s, when SF film stopped all internal film production.

Upon completion, The Unknown Soldier was the longest and most expensive film in the Finnish cinema history up to that point: 181 minutes and, according to the account book, FIM 46,667,761.

At the beginning and end of the film Finlandia, by Finnish national composer Jean Sibelius, is played. The music used in the film is a mixture of the original music composed for the film by Ahti Sonninen and the finished music.

Legacy
Since 2000, Yle has broadcast the film every year on the Independence Day of Finland (December 6). In 2015, the movie was moved to Yle Teema, away from its usual slot on either Yle TV1 or Yle TV2.

In 1985, with Väinö Linna's approval, Rauni Mollberg directed a remake. This film follows the novel more closely but also features obvious visual nods to the 1955 version.

A new film version, directed by Aku Louhimies came out in 2017, made its television premiere on the Independence Day of Finland (December 6) in 2021.

See also

 The Unknown Soldier (novel)
 The Unknown Soldier and Finnish Cinematographic Art commemorative €10 coin
 Talvisota (film)
 Winter War

References

External links
 
 

1955 films
Eastern Front of World War II films
Films based on military novels
Films directed by Edvin Laine
Films set in Finland
Films set in Russia
Films set in 1941
Films set in 1942
Films set in 1943
Films set in 1944
Films shot in Finland
1950s Finnish-language films
Films based on Finnish novels
Films based on works by Väinö Linna
1950s war films
Finnish World War II films
Finnish war films
Finnish black-and-white films